Coleophora phlomidis is a moth of the family Coleophoridae. It is found in Romania, southern Russia, central Asia and Asia Minor (Iran and Syria).

Adults are on wing from the middle of July to the middle of August.

The larvae feed on the leaves of Phlomis species (including Phlomis cancellata and Phlomis kopetdaghensis). They create a lobe case. The rear and oldest part is strongly curved downwards. The mouth angle is 90°.

References

phlomidis
Moths of Europe
Moths of Asia
Moths described in 1867